Wynne Hooper (born 5 June 1952) is a Welsh former professional footballer. He attended Neath Grammar School. A winger, he began his career as an apprentice with Newport County and made 178 English Football League appearances for the club, scoring 21 goals.

In 1976 Hooper moved to Swindon Town and in 1977 to Aldershot. In 1979, he moved to Bridgend Town.

References

External links

People from Seven Sisters, Neath Port Talbot
Sportspeople from Neath Port Talbot
Welsh footballers
Newport County A.F.C. players
Swindon Town F.C. players
Aldershot F.C. players
English Football League players
1952 births
Living people
Association football wingers
Bridgend Town A.F.C. players